Joseph Havelock Wilson  (16 August 1859 – 16 April 1929), commonly known as Havelock Wilson or J. Havelock Wilson, was a British trade union leader, Liberal Party politician, and campaigner for the rights of merchant seamen.

Early life
He was born in Sunderland and went to sea as a boy, serving somewhere between 10 and 14 years at sea. In 1879 whilst still a seaman he married Jane Ann Watham at Sunderland. In 1882 he opened a "Temperance Hotel" in Sunderland settling down to life ashore at the age of 24.

Trade union activities
He became involved in a local seamen's union established in Sunderland in 1879 and had become its president by 1885. Wilson pursued a policy of attempting to build branches in nearby ports, which met with some success but led to disagreements within the leadership. In 1887, Wilson broke with the Sunderland union to establish his own National Sailors' & Firemen's Union, which was committed to a policy of expansion. Wilson remained president of the union until his death.

Wilson rose to prominence in the late 1880s, on the back of the success of his union and his involvement in various strikes, including the London dock strike of 1889. Wilson's union suffered in the early 1890s and almost collapsed in 1894. Its revival came in 1911, with the outbreak of a wave of seamen's and dockers' strikes in British ports. Despite his militant tactics, Wilson was a relative moderate whose goal was to establish friendly relations with shipowners and formal conciliation procedures in the shipping industry to enable disputes to be resolved without recourse to strikes or lockouts. This goal was steadily achieved after shipowners recognised the union in 1911 and began working closely with officials during the First World War. After 1917, wage rates and conditions were set by the National Maritime Board, which represented the Shipping Federation and Wilson's union. In the 1920s, Wilson's reputation as a 'bosses' man' made him increasingly unpopular in the wider labour movement.

Political career
Wilson's first electoral contest was at a by-election in Bristol East in 1890, at which he did poorly. He won his second contest, at Middlesbrough in 1892, in which he stood as an independent labour candidate in opposition to a Gladstonian Liberal, and a Liberal Unionist. Having secured election, however, Wilson moved quickly to align himself with the Liberal Party and existing Lib–Lab Members of Parliament (MPs) such as Thomas Burt and John Wilson. Wilson continued to align himself with the Liberal Party in politics despite the establishment and growth of the Independent Labour Party. Indeed, he was fiercely critical of the party and of key figures within it such as Keir Hardie and Ramsay MacDonald. 

In 1893, Wilson brought an unsuccessful action for libel against The Evening News and Post, seeking thousands in damages. The newspaper was represented by the Irish Unionist Edward Carson. In late July 1893, a jury at Guildford found against Wilson, and the judge, Sir William Grantham, a former Conservative member of parliament, ordered him to pay the newspaper’s costs.

Wilson retained his Middlesbrough seat in the 1895 general election but narrowly lost to Samuel Alexander Sadler, a Conservative, in the 1900 election – an election characterised by a considerable swing towards the Conservatives. He won Middlesbrough for a third and final time at the 1906 election. 

He did not stand in 1910.

He was a founder of the National Democratic Party but stood as a Liberal at the October 1918 by-election in South Shields, when he was elected unopposed. He held the seat as a Coalition Liberal at the 1918 general election. His last electoral contest came at the 1922 general election, when he stood as a National Liberal candidate, but lost his seat – coming third with only 20.5% of the vote.

Wilson was noted as one of the most vociferous supporters of Britain's involvement in the First World War.

Havelock Wilson was buried in Hendon Park Cemetery, with many dockers in attendance having walked to the graveside from Docklands.

References

 Havelock Wilson exposed (1921) Early attempt by followers of Lenin to smear Wilson.

External links 
 
 

Liberal Party (UK) MPs for English constituencies
British trade union leaders
Liberal-Labour (UK) MPs
Members of the Parliamentary Committee of the Trades Union Congress
National Democratic and Labour Party MPs
National Union of Seamen-sponsored MPs
1859 births
1929 deaths
UK MPs 1892–1895
UK MPs 1895–1900
UK MPs 1906–1910
UK MPs 1910–1918
UK MPs 1918–1922
Trade unionists from Tyne and Wear
People from Sunderland
Politicians from Tyne and Wear
Members of the Order of the Companions of Honour
Commanders of the Order of the British Empire
National Liberal Party (UK, 1922) politicians
British Merchant Navy personnel